Croatia selected their Junior Eurovision Song Contest 2014 entry through an internal selection. On 2 October 2014 it was revealed that Josephine Zec would represent Croatia in the contest with the song "Game Over".

Internal selection
Despite withdrawing from the Eurovision Song Contest 2014, on 26 September 2014 it was announced that Croatia would return to the Junior Eurovision Song Contest in 2014, after a seven-year absence. On 2 October 2014, the Croatian broadcaster HRT announced that Josephine Zec had been internally selected to represent the Balkan country with the song "Game Over". A presentation of the song took place on 3 October 2014 at 09:30 CET on the television show "Puni Kerg".

At Junior Eurovision 
At the running order draw which took place on 9 November 2014, Croatia were drawn to perform fourth on 15 November 2014, following  and preceding .

Voting

Detailed voting results
The following members comprised the Croatian jury:
 Duško Mandić
 Iva Šulentić
 Nensi Atanasov
 Ivan Horvat
 Jacques Houdek

Notes

References

Junior Eurovision Song Contest
Croatia
Junior